Lenar Ildusovich Gilmullin (17 June 1985 – 22 June 2007) was a Russian football full-back of Tatar origin who played for FC Rubin Kazan and the Russia Under-21 team.

Death
On the 17 to 18 June 2007 night, he was injured in a motorcycle accident following his birthday party. After spending several days in coma, he died on 22 June, five days after his 22nd birthday.

References

External links
Lenar Gilmullin career stats at Rubin-Kazan.ru 

1985 births
2007 deaths
FC Rubin Kazan players
Russian Premier League players
Motorcycle road incident deaths
Footballers from Kazan
Road incident deaths in Russia
Russian footballers
Russia under-21 international footballers
Tatar people of Russia
Tatar sportspeople
Association football defenders